Charles Delgado (4 July 1884 – 30 December 1966) was a Jamaican cricketer. He played in two first-class matches for the Jamaican cricket team in 1910/11.

See also
 List of Jamaican representative cricketers

References

External links
 

1884 births
1966 deaths
Jamaican cricketers
Jamaica cricketers